Swakopmund railway station is a railway station serving the town of Swakopmund in Namibia. It is part of the TransNamib railway network.
Its IATA code is ZSZ.

Overview
Swakopmund was the starting point of the first state railway line in German South West Africa. The railway station was built in 1901, as a terminal on the  Imperial Germany's colonial Kaiserliche Eisenbahn line connecting Swakopmund with Windhoek. The station was designed by Willi Sander, who also later designed Swakopmund Lighthouse. In 1914 the extension to Walvis Bay was completed, with a railtrack very close to the shore of the Atlantic Ocean. In 1980 this extension was replaced by an alternative route behind the dunes that allowed for higher axle load.

The station building, declared a national monument in 1972, today serves as a hotel and casino; trains stop outside town. There is another former station building in Swakopmund, the O.M.E.G. Bahnhof of the private mining company Otavi Minen und Eisenbahn Gesellschaft, today housing a museum.

See also
 Rail transport in Namibia

References

Swakopmund
Railway stations in Namibia
TransNamib Railway
Buildings and structures in Erongo Region
Railway stations opened in 1901
1901 establishments in German South West Africa